Laag (local Tyrolean dialect: Låg) is a frazione of the comune of Neumarkt in South Tyrol in the Italian region of Trentino-Alto Adige/Südtirol, located about 30 km northeast of the city of Trento and about 25 km south of the city of Bolzano. Laag is situated on the plain (213 m) on the left side of the Adige river.

Etymology

The earliest written mention of the name Laag (local Tyrolean dialect: Låg) was the 1237 document describing the Holy Roman Empire town in the district of Bavaria-Tyrol in the form ze Lage. In 1525 the Tyroler Landsatlas describes it as Lag. The etymological base is to be considered the Germanic låg, in turn derived from the proto-Germanic *lōgą ("site, foundation, field") and proto-Indo -European *legʰ- (to be located, to lie), similar to the Gaelic loch, through the Latin lacus (lake).

References

Frazioni of South Tyrol